Mathabhanga Railway Station serves the town of Mathabhanga which lies in the bank of River Jaldhaka in Cooch Behar district in the Indian state of West Bengal. The station lies on the New Mal–Changrabandha–New Cooch Behar line of Northeast Frontier Railway. The station lies on Alipurduar railway division.

Trains
Major Trains:
Dibrugarh–Kanyakumari Vivek Express
New Tinsukia–Rajendra Nagar Weekly Express
New Alipurduar - Sealdah Superfast Padatik Express

References

Alipurduar railway division
Railway stations in West Bengal
Railway stations in Cooch Behar district